Silobela is a constituency of the National Assembly of the Parliament of Zimbabwe, located in Midlands Province. Its current MP since the 2018 election is Mtokozisi Manoki-Mpofu of ZANU–PF.

History

In the 1985–1990 term the whole of Silobela Communal Land and Zhombe Communal Land were part of one big constituency, Kwekwe West, whose MP was Hon. Josiah Tavagwisa Chinyati. From 2000 to 2008 the boundaries of Silobela constituency remained the same. 9 wards of Redcliff Municipality were under Silobela. At present the Redcliff Municipal wards are no longer part of this constituency. Also ward 5, 15 and 26 of the Kwekwe Rural District Council Zibagwe RDC which are in Zhombe have been added to this constituency. The current Silobela constituency comprises wards 4, 5, 15, 17, 18, 19, 20, 21, 25, 27, 28, 29 and 33.

Members

Election results

References

Parliamentary constituencies in Zimbabwe